Robin Dale Bartel (born May 16, 1961) is a Canadian former professional ice hockey defenceman who played in the National Hockey League during the mid-1980s. He appeared in 41 NHL games, recording an assist and 14 penalty minutes. Prior to making his NHL debut Bartel played for the Canadian national team at the 1984 Winter Olympics.

Playing career
Bartel played three seasons of Junior hockey with the Prince Albert Raiders spanning 1979–1982, winning two national championships in his final two years. A stay-at-home defender, Bartel played at the University of Saskatchewan and won a CIAU National Championship, now known as the David Johnston University Cup, before joining the Canadian National Team for the 1983–84 season and representing Canada at the 1984 Winter Olympics. Never drafted, Bartel signed with the Calgary Flames and spent two seasons in their organization, appearing in a single regular season NHL game for the Flames in 1985–86 and six playoff games, including the 1986 Stanley Cup Finals.

Bartel signed as a free agent with the Vancouver Canucks for the 1986–87 season and stuck with the team as a depth defender, appearing in 40 games and recording a single assist. However, he would lose his spot the following year and spend the entire season in the minors.

After another stint with the Canadian National Team and a year in Britain, Bartel retired in 1990. He played two games in the American Hockey League with the St. John's Maple Leafs during the 1993–94 AHL season.

Career statistics

Regular season and playoffs

International

References

External links

1961 births
Living people
Calgary Flames players
Canadian ice hockey defencemen
Ice hockey people from Saskatchewan
Ice hockey players at the 1984 Winter Olympics
Olympic ice hockey players of Canada
Saskatchewan Huskies ice hockey players
St. John's Maple Leafs players
Undrafted National Hockey League players
Vancouver Canucks players